Andrew Goldberg (born March 17, 1978) is an American writer and producer.

Goldberg co-created the Netflix adult animated series Big Mouth with his childhood best friend Nick Kroll, and Mark Levin and Jennifer Flackett, and serves as a writer and executive producer. Prior to that, he wrote for Family Guy. He is also the author of Family Guy: Brian's Guide to Booze, Broads, and the Lost Art of Being a Man, a book published by HarperCollins focusing on Brian Griffin's beliefs.

Goldberg was born and raised in White Plains, New York and is of Jewish descent. He earned his BA at Columbia University in 2000 and his MFA at the UCLA School of Film & Television in 2002.

References

External links

American television writers
American male television writers
Annie Award winners
People from White Plains, New York
Columbia College (New York) alumni
UCLA Film School alumni
Living people
Jewish American writers
American humorists
21st-century American novelists
American male novelists
American male screenwriters
1978 births
21st-century American male writers
Screenwriters from New York (state)
21st-century American screenwriters
21st-century American Jews
Jewish American comedy writers